John Edward McCosker is an American ichthyologist and as has been part of expeditions to many countries such as Antarctic, Australia, and the Galapagos. After extensive study and ten expeditions he is one of the foremost experts on the Galapagos. He has been featured in various different television documentaries as well as working with filmmakers and other documentary programs off screen.

McCosker earned his BA degree from the Occidental College (Los Angeles) in 1967. He attended the Scripps Institution of Oceanography in 1973 where McCosker gained his PhD degree. Currently he is a senior scientist at the California Academy of Sciences based in San Francisco. He joined the academy in 1973 as superintendent within the Steinhart Aquarium. Between 1976 and 1994 he was the director. From 1988 to 1989, and again in 1995, he was the Interim Executive Director for the Academy.

The generic name of the blenny Mccoskerichthys sandae honours McCosker, because he discovered it and assisted in the collection of the type while its specific name honours his then wife, Sandra.

Filmography

Dr. McCosker also appeared on The Tonight Show, starring Johnny Carson on July 12, 1984. Other guests on the episode were Miss Piggy and Howie Mandel.

See also
:Category:Taxa named by John E. McCosker

References

http://www.calacademy.org/explore-science/john-mccosker
http://www.mnh.si.edu/expeditions/galapagos/davem.htm
The New York Times Movies

External links

American oceanographers
American ichthyologists
Living people
People associated with the California Academy of Sciences
Occidental College alumni
Scientists from California
21st-century American scientists
Year of birth missing (living people)